The Baptist Collegiate Network (BCN) is a college-level organization that can be found on many college campuses in the United States and Canada; many of its collegiate ministries operate under the name Baptist Collegiate Ministry or the Baptist Student Union. 

The organization, while Baptist, functions as an interdenominational and coeducational fellowship, student society and service organization. Baptist Collegiate Network is primarily associated with the Southern or Great Commission Baptists. Its purpose statement is: "To lead college students and others in the academic community to faith in Jesus Christ, to develop them as disciples and leaders, and to connect them to the life and mission of the church."

According to Baptist Press in 2012, the network had more than 69,500 students actively involved in campus ministry through this organization and its affiliated state-level Baptist conventions.

References

External links 
 

Baptist universities and colleges
Student religious organizations in the United States
Student religious organizations in Canada
Fellowships